WTPS (1240 kHz) is a classic hip hop formatted broadcast radio station licensed to Petersburg, Virginia, serving Metro Petersburg.  WTPS is owned and operated by Urban One.  The station's studios and offices are located just north of Richmond proper on Emerywood Parkway in Petersburg.

The station has broadcast the sports programming of WXGI Richmond since Urban One's purchase of that station on May 1, 2017 in order to give WXGI a metro Richmond FM signal.

On April 19, 2021 WTPS changed their format from sports to classic hip hop, branded as "The Box".

Translator
On July 9, 2016, WTPS began relaying its signal on an FM translator to widen its broadcast area. The translator is fed by WCDX-HD2.

Previous logo

References

External links

TPS
Radio stations established in 1945
1945 establishments in Virginia
Classic hip hop radio stations in the United States